Bartolomeo Cesi (1566–1621) was a Roman Catholic cardinal.

Biography
Belonging to the powerful Cesi family, on 18 Sep 1605 he was consecrated bishop by Bonifazio Caetani, Bishop of Cassano all'Jonio, with Pietro Francesco Montorio, Bishop of Nicastro, and Placido della Marra, Bishop of Melfi e Rapolla, serving as co-consecrator.

References

1566 births
1621 deaths
17th-century Italian cardinals
17th-century Italian Roman Catholic archbishops